Bako may refer to:

People
Bako (name)
Bako (footballer), a nickname for the Lebanese footballer Abou Bakr Al-Mel

Places
Bako National Park, Malaysia
Bako, Ethiopia
Bako, Ivory Coast
Bako, Sarawak, an administrative area under the authority of Dewan Bandaraya Kuching Utara, Malaysia
Bako, the former name of Makung City, Taiwan
Bakó, the Hungarian name for Bacău, Romania
A nickname for Bakersfield, California, US

Other uses
Bako language, a dialect of Aari language
Bako (bug), a genus of lace bugs in the family Tingida

See also
Baku, capital of Azerbaijan